Oscar Murphy Dorley (born 19 July 1998) is a Liberian professional footballer who plays as a left-back for Slavia Prague. He also plays for the Liberia national team.

Club career
Born in Monrovia, Dorley spent his early career with Monrovia Club Breweries and Trakai. In February 2018, he joined Czech team FC Slovan Liberec on loan for the remainder of the 2017–18 season. In January 2019, he made the deal permanent, signing a three-and-a-half-year contract.

On 11 August 2019, Dorley signed for Slavia Prague on a four-year contract from Slovan Liberec, with the midfielder staying on loan at Slovan Liberec until the end of 2019.

International career
He made his international debut for Liberia on 5 July 2015 in a 1–1 Africa Cup of Nations qualifying draw against Guinea.

Honors
Slavia Prague
Czech First League: 2019–20, 2020–21

References

External links
 

1998 births
Living people
Liberian footballers
Liberia international footballers
Monrovia Club Breweries players
FK Riteriai players
FC Slovan Liberec players
SK Slavia Prague players
A Lyga players
Czech First League players
Association football midfielders
Liberian expatriate footballers
Liberian expatriate sportspeople in Lithuania
Expatriate footballers in Lithuania
Liberian expatriate sportspeople in the Czech Republic
Expatriate footballers in the Czech Republic